Gruzdi is a rural locality (a village) in Dvurechenskoye Rural Settlement, Permsky District, Perm Krai, Russia. The population was 11 as of 2010. There are 19  streets.

Geography 
Gruzdi is located 48 km southeast of Perm (the district's administrative centre) by road. Staroverovo is the nearest rural locality.

References 

Rural localities in Permsky District